Based on statistics from 2006, there are approximately 2100 persons living with disabilities in Samoa. There is no specific legislation protecting the rights of persons with disabilities nor is it a basis for freedom from discrimination in Samoa's constitution. Samoa is not a party to the UN Convention on the Rights of Persons with Disabilities yet has indicated that they would consider acceding to it.

The government has set up a National Disabilities Taskforce which constructs programmes that provide assistance to persons with disabilities. This is guided by the National Policy and National Plan of Action for Persons with Disabilities set up in 2009. Nuanua O Le Alofa, the country's peak disability rights advocacy organisation, was established in 2001. In 2017 it hosted the 5th Pacific Regional Conference on Disability.

Samoa has participated in every Summer Paralympics since the 2000 Summer Paralympics, but has never taken part in the Winter Paralympic Games.

See also 
 Faʻatino Masunu Utumapu

References

External links 
 SUBMISSION TO THE UNIVERSAL  PERIODIC REVIEW COMMITTEE  FROM  Nuanua O Le Alofa Inc.(NOLA)